Gene Autry was an American singing cowboy.

The name may also refer to:

 The Gene Autry Show, a television program
 Gene Autry's Melody Ranch, a radio program
 "Gene Autry", a song by the band Beulah from their 2001 album The Coast Is Never Clear
 Gene Autry, Oklahoma, a town
 Gene Autry Formation, a geological formation
 Gene Autry Shale, a geological formation
 Autry Museum of the American West, a museum founded as the Gene Autry Western Heritage Museum